Group A of the 2014 FIBA Basketball World Cup was the group stage of the 2014 FIBA Basketball World Cup for , , , ,  and . Each team played each other once, for a total of five games per team, with all games played at Palacio Municipal de Deportes de Granada, Granada. After all of the games were played, the four teams with the best records qualified for the final round.

Teams

Standings

All times are local UTC+2.

30 August

Egypt vs. Serbia
This was the first competitive game between Egypt and Serbia.

France vs. Brazil
This was the fifth meeting between France and Brazil in the World Cup. Brazil has won three games, with Frances's only win coming from their last meeting in the 1986 FIBA World Championship, which was also their last competitive game against each other.

Iran vs. Spain
This was the first competitive game between Iran and Spain.

31 August

Serbia vs. France
This was the first game between Serbia and France in the World Cup. The two teams have met twice in the EuroBasket, with France winning in 2011, and Serbia winning in 2013.

Brazil vs. Iran
This was the second meeting between Brazil and Iran in the World Cup. Brazil won on their first game, in the 2010 FIBA World Championship.

Spain vs. Egypt
This was the fourth game between Spain and Egypt in the World Cup. Spain has won two, including their last meeting at the 1994 FIBA World Championship.

1 September

Iran vs. Serbia
This was the first competitive game between Iran and Serbia.

France vs. Egypt
This was the second game between France and Egypt in the World Cup, with France winning their first meeting in the 1950 FIBA World Championship. France won the last competitive game against Egypt at the 1984 Olympics.

Brazil vs. Spain
This was the eighth game between Brazil and Spain. Spain has won 6 games, including their last game in the 2002 FIBA World Championship, with Brazil's only win coming from their meeting in the 1986 FIBA World Championship. Brazil won in the last competitive game against Spain at the 2012 Olympics.

3 September

Egypt vs. Iran
This was the first game between Egypt and Iran.

Serbia vs. Brazil
This was the first competitive game between Serbia and Brazil.

Spain vs. France
This was the third game between France and Spain in the World Cup. Both teams split their first two games, with France winning in their last game at the 2010 FIBA World Championship. The French won at the FIBA EuroBasket 2013 semifinals, the last competitive game between them.

4 September

Brazil vs. Egypt
This was the second game between Brazil and Egypt in the World Cup. Brazil won their first meeting in the 1950 FIBA World Championship. Their latest competitive game against each other was a Brazil victory at the 1988 Olympics.

Iran vs. France
This was the first game between Iran and France in the World Cup. Their only other competitive meeting was in the 1948 Olympics in which France won.

Serbia vs. Spain
This was the second meeting between Serbia and Spain in the World Cup. Serbia defeated Spain in their meeting at the 2010 FIBA World Championship. Spain won the last competitive game against Serbia at the FIBA EuroBasket 2013.

External links
 
 

Group A
2014–15 in Spanish basketball
2014–15 in Brazilian basketball
2014–15 in French basketball
Serbia at the 2014 FIBA Basketball World Cup
2014 in Iranian sport
2014 in Egyptian sport